Tipula monticola is a species in the family Tipulidae ("large crane flies"), in the order Diptera ("flies").

References

Further reading

External links

Tipulidae
Insects described in 1915